Lee Jie-hyun (also Lee Ji-hyeon; born 16 October 1979) is a South Korean swimmer. She competed in four events at the 1996 Summer Olympics.

She was educated at Gawon Middle School, Kyunggi Girls' High School, and UCLA.

References

External links
 

1979 births
Living people
South Korean female freestyle swimmers
South Korean female medley swimmers
Olympic swimmers of South Korea
Swimmers at the 1996 Summer Olympics
Place of birth missing (living people)
Swimmers at the 1994 Asian Games
Asian Games bronze medalists for South Korea
Medalists at the 1994 Asian Games
Asian Games medalists in swimming
20th-century South Korean women